The men's middleweight event was part of the boxing programme at the 1924 Summer Olympics. The weight class was the third-heaviest contested, and allowed boxers of up to 160 pounds (72.6 kilograms). The competition was held from Tuesday July 15, 1924 to Sunday July 20, 1924. Twenty-three boxers from 15 nations competed.

This competition saw one of the most controversial bouts in Olympic history, when Frenchman Roger Brousse and defending Olympic champion Harry Mallin from Great Britain faced each other in the quarterfinals. Near the end of the fight Mallin complained to the Belgian referee that Brousse had bitten him. Mallin showed the referee bite marks on his chest and shoulder. His protest was overruled by the judges and the bout was awarded to the French boxer on points (2:1). An appeal launched by Swedish official and IOC member Oscar Söderlund brought forward medical evidence that Mallin had been bitten. Manuel Gallardo also came forward with a complaint about being bitten by Brousse in their bout. Brousse was disqualified and Mallin became the winner, even though the jury declared that the foul had not been intentional. French fans had to be restrained by the police from charging the ring.

Two days later the French crowd were still incensed when Mallin boxed in the final against John Elliott. Brousse came in his boxing attire and his fans lifted him up into the ring. Only after intervention by the police were the two British opponents able to contest the final.

Results

References

External links
 

Middleweight